William Taylor (1836 – April 6, 1902) was a Union Army soldier and officer during the American Civil War. He received the Medal of Honor for gallantry during two separate Virginia engagements. The Battle of Front Royal in 1862 and the Battle of Globe Tavern in 1864.

Medal of Honor citation
"The President of the United States of America, in the name of Congress, takes pleasure in presenting the Medal of Honor to Sergeant & Second Lieutenant William Taylor, United States Army, for extraordinary heroism while serving with Company H, 1st Maryland Infantry as a sergeant, at Front Royal, Virginia, 23 May 1862. William Taylor was painfully wounded while obeying an order to burn a bridge, but, persevering in the attempt, he burned the bridge and prevented its use by the enemy. Later, on 19 August 1864, at Weldon Railroad, Virginia, then a lieutenant serving with Company M, he voluntarily took the place of a disabled officer and undertook a hazardous reconnaissance beyond the lines of the army; was taken prisoner in the attempt."

The Medal of Honor was awarded to Taylor on August 2, 1897.

Obituaries, etc.
Obituary and News Clippings of William Taylor from Baltimore

Death Register:  Baltimore American, Monday, April 7, 1902, Page 1
TAYLOR—Suddenly, Sunday morning, at his residence, Number 19 Fairview avenue,  Captain WILLIAM, husband of Ruth M.  [Chester, Philadelphia (Pa.),  Washington, (D.C.) and Evansville (Ind.) papers please copy.]

Baltimore Morning Sun; Tuesday, April 8, 1902, Page 8
CAPT. WILLIAM TAYLOR
Capt. William Taylor, 66 years old, a veteran of the Civil War, died Sunday morning at his home, 19 Fairview avenue, Carroll, in the southwestern suburbs, of Bright's disease, superinduced by wounds which he received during the Civil War.  A few weeks ago a wound in his right leg healed and since that time he had been growing steadily worse.
	The funeral will take place tomorrow afternoon and services will be conducted by Rev. Charles T. House, pastor of the Memorial Methodist Episcopal Church.  Burial will be made in the National Cemetery, adjoining Loudon Park.
	Captain Taylor entered the service as a sergeant in Company H of the First Maryland Regiment on May 27, 1861, and was promoted to be a second lieutenant of Company C of the same regiment on April 12, 1863.  He was made captain of Company E on June 7, 1865, and was mustered out of service with his company July 2, 1865.
	Captain Taylor received a medal of honor for his gallantry at Front Royal, Va., where on May 23, 1862, he succeeded in setting fire to a bridge in order to check the advance of the Confederates.  A comrade in arms, who was with him, was killed outright, while Captain Taylor was shot in the right hand.
	In the battle of Petersburg, Va., on August 14, 1864, Captain Taylor carried the colors in the face of a terrific fire, and after several of the standard-bearers had been shot down.  It was in this engagement that he received the wound in the leg from which he never fully recovered.
	Captain Taylor was a member of the Union Veteran Legion, Wilson Post and the Medal of Honor Legion.  He was twice married, his first wife dying about 25 years ago.  About 20 years ago he married Mrs. Ruth M. Marling, who survives him, with two sons and a daughter.

Baltimore American, Monday, April 7, 1902, Page 12
HIS LIFE FULL OF BRAVE DEEDS.
CAPTAIN WILLIAM TAYLOR, OF UNION ARMY, DEAD.

For Many Years He Had Suffered From Wounds Which Caused His Death – With a Companion He Volunteered to Burn a Bridge at Front Royal in 1862 – His Companion Was Killed, and Alone, He Accomplished the Task While the Target of the Enemy – At Weldon Railroad Capt. Taylor Penetrated the Confederate's Lines and Gained Valuable Information.  Conspicuous for Bravery.

Capt. William Taylor, of the First Maryland Regiment, G.A.R., aged 66 years, died at his home, 19 Fairview avenue, yesterday morning.  His death was caused by wounds received during the Civil War.  A few weeks ago, Captain Taylor complained of the wounds.  On last Tuesday, he was taken seriously ill.  He grew worse, and his doctor said that the wounds were the immediate cause of his death.  He is survived by his wife, Ruth M., and two sons and one daughter.  Captain Taylor was a member of Union Veteran Legion, No. 109, Wilson Post and the Medal of Honor Legion.  Funeral services will be held from his home Wednesday afternoon with military orders.  The remains will be interred at the National Cemetery.  Rev. Mr. Charles House, pastor of the Memorial Methodist Episcopal Church, will officiate.  Joseph Cook, undertaker, will have charge of the arrangements.
Captain Taylor's military career is distinguished by two most daring deeds.  The first was the burning of a bridge at Front Royal, Va., May 23, 1862, where a detachment of Stonewall Jackson's force fell upon and routed a body of General Banks, with a loss of 904 men.  Captain Taylor, in company with another man, volunteered to rush forward, in the face of a deadly fire from the enemy, and destroy this bridge to prevent the Confederates from crossing.  The rush was made in safety, although shot fell all around them until they neared the place where they were to fire the bridge.
Here Captain Taylor's companion was killed, and he himself was severely wounded in the right hand.  Nevertheless, he succeeded in firing the bridge, and so prevented an attack by the Confederates.
His second notable adventure took place at the Weldon Railroad, Virginia, August 19, 1864, after he had been promoted to be a lieutenant.  On the evening of August 19, during a heavy rain, the Confederates charged with a yell.  The brigade was on the extreme left with the brigade of regulars on the Maryland's right, who broke and ran.  Later the Southerners retreated, and the Marylanders held the ground until the regulars were brought back.  That night a regiment of the Marylanders was sent out on picket line, which they left and came into camp.  Captain Taylor was detailed, with Captain McClellan, of General Ayer's staff, with 16 men and a sergeant, to reconnoiter the enemy's position.  Leaving the men inside the lines, Captain McClellan, Captain Taylor, and the sergeant got through the enemy's lines and arrived near a house where Heath, the Confederate general, had his headquarters.
Captain McClellan and Taylor started to return to their men, leaving the sergeant behind, but were captured on the way, the sergeant being taken shortly after.  The Maryland Brigade was sent to Petersburg the next day and from there to Richmond, and remained in Libby Prison about two months, until Fort Harrison, some four miles below, was taken.  Later on Captain Taylor managed to escape in company with two other officers.
Captain Taylor entered the service as a sergeant in Company H, First Maryland Regiment, May 27, 1861; promoted second lieutenant Company C, April 12, 1863; Captain Company E, June 7, 1865.  He was mustered out of service, with his company, July 2, 1865.  Captain Taylor received a medal of honor for his gallantry at Front Royal, Va., May 23, 1862.  In the battle of Petersburg, August 14, 1864, which lasted three hours, and when several of the color bearers were shot down, Captain Taylor took the banner and carried it until relieved by a newly appointed bearer.  Captain Taylor was severely wounded in the leg, from which he never recovered.

See also

List of Medal of Honor recipients
List of American Civil War Medal of Honor recipients: T–Z

Notes

References

External links
Military Times Hall of Valor

1836 births
1902 deaths
People from Washington, D.C.
People of Maryland in the American Civil War
Union Army officers
American Civil War prisoners of war
United States Army Medal of Honor recipients
American Civil War recipients of the Medal of Honor